The following are lists of stadiums throughout the world. Note that horse racing and motorsport venues are not included, because those are not stadiums but sports venues.

Combined lists

 List of sports attendance figures
 List of sports venues by capacity
 List of attendance figures at domestic professional sports leagues
 List of stadiums by capacity
 List of sporting venues with a highest attendance of 100,000 or more
 List of covered stadiums by capacity
 List of indoor arenas by capacity
 List of indoor arenas by country
 List of closed stadiums by capacity
 List of future stadiums
 List of sponsored sports stadiums
 List of Olympic Stadiums

By region and country

 List of stadiums in Africa
 List of stadiums in Asia
 List of stadiums in Central America and the Caribbean
 List of stadiums in Europe
 List of stadiums in Oceania
 List of stadiums in North America (excluding Central America and the Caribbean)
 List of stadiums in South America

By region and capacity

 List of African stadiums by capacity
 List of Asian stadiums by capacity
 List of East Asia stadiums by capacity
 List of Southeast Asia stadiums by capacity
 List of European stadiums by capacity
 List of North American stadiums by capacity
 List of Oceanian stadiums by capacity
 List of South American stadiums by capacity

By sport

 Baseball - List of baseball parks by capacity
 Baseball - List of current Major League Baseball stadiums
 Basketball - List of basketball arenas by capacity
 Basketball - List of National Basketball Association arenas
 Cricket - List of cricket grounds by capacity
 Cycling - List of cycling tracks and velodromes
 Football / American - List of American football stadiums by capacity
 Football / American - List of current National Football League stadiums
 Football / Association - List of association football stadiums by capacity
 Football / Association - List of association football stadiums by country
 Football / Canadian - List of Canadian Football League stadiums
 Gaelic Athletic Association - List of Gaelic Athletic Association stadiums
 Hockey - List of National Hockey League arenas
 Horse racing - List of horse racing venues by capacity
 Horse racing - List of horse racing venues by country
 Motor racing - List of motor racing venues by capacity
 Motor racing - List of motor racing tracks by country
 Motor racing - List of NASCAR race tracks
 Rowing - List of rowing venues
 Rugby - List of rugby league stadiums by capacity
 Rugby - List of rugby union stadiums by capacity
 Tennis - List of tennis stadiums by capacity
 Tennis - List of tennis venues by country
 Track and field - List of track and field stadiums by capacity

See also
 Lists of buildings and structures
 List of contemporary amphitheatres
 List of music venues

External links
Stadium Database
World Stadiums
The Stadium Guide
Arch Daily stadiums
Soccerway
Stadia (Greece)
Ballparks by Munsey and Suppes
Stadiums of Pro Football
Ballparks of Baseball
College Gridirons

 
Lists of buildings and structures